Pelasgus is a genus of cyprinid fishes that is only found in the Balkans. There are currently seven described species in this genus.

Species
 Pelasgus epiroticus (Steindachner, 1895) 
 Pelasgus laconicus (Kottelat & Barbieri, 2004) (Evrotas minnow)
 Pelasgus marathonicus (Vinciguerra, 1921) (Marathon minnow)
 Pelasgus minutus (S. L. Karaman, 1924) (Ohrid minnow)
 Pelasgus prespensis (S. L. Karaman, 1924) (Prespa minnow)
 Pelasgus stymphalicus (Valenciennes, 1844) (dáska)
 Pelasgus thesproticus (Stephanidis, 1939) (Epiros minnow)

References
 

 
Taxa named by Maurice Kottelat
Taxa named by Jörg Freyhof 
Cyprinid fish of Europe
Cyprinidae genera